Sydney Thomas Callaway (6 February 1868 in Redfern, Sydney – 25 November 1923 in Christchurch) was an Australian cricketer who played in three Tests, all of them against England in Australia.

In 1891/92 he played in Sydney and Melbourne, and in 1894/95 he played in Adelaide where he took 5/37 in the first innings. In the Sydney Test, he was the second victim in a hat-trick by Johnny Briggs. He played in 62 first-class matches, taking 320 wickets at an average of just over 17 runs per wicket.

After he moved to New Zealand to play for Canterbury he also played several matches for New Zealand, including two against Australia, in the era before New Zealand played Test cricket. In the 1903–04 season in New Zealand he took 54 first-class wickets in five matches at an average of 8.77, with a best analysis of 8 for 33 and 7 for 27, bowling unchanged throughout, in the match against Hawke's Bay, as well as 5 for 94 and 6 for 4 against Wellington, when Wellington were dismissed for 22 in the second innings.

At the time of his death, which came after a long illness, he was employed as a clerk for the Canterbury Frozen Meat Company. He left a widow, Mary, and a son.

See also
 List of New South Wales representative cricketers

References

External links
 Cricinfo article on Sydney Callaway
 Sydney Callaway at CricketArchive

1868 births
1923 deaths
Australia Test cricketers
New South Wales cricketers
Canterbury cricketers
Australian cricketers
Pre-1930 New Zealand representative cricketers
New Zealand cricketers
Cricketers from Sydney
South Island cricketers